Matt Faulkner can refer to:

Matt Faulkner, author of the book Most Likely to Survive
Matt Faulkner, quarterback for the 2011 San Jose State Spartans football team